Media psychology is the branch and specialty field in psychology that focuses on the interaction of human behavior with media and technology. Media psychology is not limited to mass media or media content; it includes all forms of mediated communication and media technology-related behaviors, such as the use, design, impact, and sharing behaviors. This branch is a relatively new field of study because of advancement in technology. It uses various methods of critical analysis and investigation to develop a working model of a user's perception of media experience. These methods are used for society as a whole and on an individual basis. Media psychologists are able to perform activities that include consulting, design, and production in various media like television, video games, films, and news broadcasting. Media psychologists are not considered to be those who are featured in media (such as counselors-psychotherapists, clinicians, etc.), rather than those who research, work or contribute to the field.

History 
There are overlaps with numerous fields, such as media studies, communication science, anthropology, education, and sociology, not to mention those within the discipline of psychology itself. Much of the research that would be considered as ‘media psychology’ has come from other fields, both academic and applied. In the 1920s, marketing, advertising and public relations professionals began conducting research on consumer behavior and motivation for commercial applications. The use of mass media during World War II, created a surge of academic interest in mass media messaging and resulted in the creation of a new field, communication science (Lazarsfeld & Merton, 2000). The field of media psychology gained prominence in the 1950s when television was becoming popular in American households. Psychologists responded to widespread social concerns about the children and their television viewing. For example, researchers began to study the impact of television viewing on children's reading skills. Later, they began to study the impact of violent television viewing on children's behavior, for example, if they were likely to exhibit anti-social behavior or to copy the violent behaviors that they were seeing. These events led up to the creation of a new division of the American Psychological Association in 1987. Division 46, the Media Psychology Division (now the APA Society for Media Psychology and Technology), is one of the fastest growing in the American Psychological Association.  Today's media psychologists study both legacy and new media forms that have risen in recent years such as cellular phone technology, the internet, and new genres of television. Media psychologists are also involved in how people are impacted and can benefit from the design of technologies such as augmented reality (AR) and virtual reality (VR) and mobile technologies, such as using VR to help trauma victims.

Theories 
Media psychology's theories include the user's perception, cognition, and humanistic components in regards to their experience to their surroundings. Media psychologists also draw upon developmental and narrative psychologies and emerging findings from neuroscience. The theories and research in psychology are used as the backbone of media psychology and guide the discipline itself. Theories in psychology applied to media include multiple dimensions, i.e., text, pictures, symbols, video and sound. Sensory Psychology, semiotics and semantics for visual and language communication, social cognition and neuroscience are among the areas addressed in the study of this area of media psychology. A few of the theories employed in media psychology include:

Affective disposition theory (ADT) 

The concept of affective disposition theory is used to differentiate users' perspectives on different forms of media content and the differences within attentional focus. The theory consists of four components that revolve around emotion: (1) media is based on an individual's emotions and opinions towards characters, (2) media content is driven from enjoyment and appreciation from individuals, (3) individuals form feelings about characters that are either positive or negative and (4) media relies on conflicts between characters and how individuals react to the conflict.

Simulation theory (ST)

Simulation theory  argues that mental simulations do not fully exclude the external information that surrounds the user. Rather that the mediated stimuli are reshaped into imagery and memories of the user in order to run the simulation. It explains why the user is able to form these experiences without the use of technology, because it points to the relevance of construction and internal processing.

Psychological theory of play

The psychological theory of play applies a more general framework to the concept of media entertainment. This idea potentially offers a more conceptual connection that points to
presence. The activity of playing exhibits consistent results to the use of entertainment objects. This theory states that play is a type of action that is characterized by three major aspects:

 It is intrinsically motivated and highly attractive.
 It implies a change in perceived reality, as players construct an additional reality while they are playing.
 It is frequently repeated.

The psychological theory of play is based upon the explanations given by eminent people such as Stephenson, Freud, Piaget, and Vygotsky. The theory is based on how an individual uses media for their satisfaction and how media changes within a person's life according to its contents. Play is used for pleasure and is self-contained. People are influenced by media both negatively and positively because we are able to relate to what we see within the environment. By looking more in-depth at the different forms of play, it becomes apparent that the early versions of make-believe play demonstrate the child's need for control and the desire to influence their current environment. The theory explains the allure play has to humans in its many forms. In video games, which replicate the feeling, players hold some aspect of responsibility in the actions that they take within the world of the game. This can allow players to feel successful and powerful. It replicates the feeling of self-efficiency and proficiency within the video game. The experience of defeat is also replicated. In addition to that, in the case of defeat, players are not able to blame their mistakes on anyone but themselves. These all explain some aspects of the pleasure that comes from play.

Major contributors 
Major contributors to media psychology include Marshall McLuhan, Dolf Zillmann, Katz, Blumler and Gurevitch, David Giles, and Bernard Luskin. Marshall McLuhan is a Canadian communication philosopher who was active from the 1930s to the 1970s in the realm of Media Analysis and Technology. He was appointed by the President of the University of Toronto in 1963 to create a new Centre for Culture and Technology to study the psychological and social consequences of technologies and media. McLuhan's famous statement pertaining to media psychology was, "The medium is the message". McLuhan's famous statement was suggestive towards the notion that media is inherently dangerous. McLuhan's theory on media called "technological determinism" would pave the way for other people to study media.

Dolf Zillmann advanced the two-factor model of emotion. The two-factor of emotion proposed that emotion involves both psychological and cognitive components. Zillmann advanced the theory of "Excitation transfer" by establishing the explanation for the effects of violent media. Zillmann's theory proposed the notion that viewer's are physiologically aroused when they watch aggressive scenes. After watching an aggressive scene, an individual will become aggressive due to the arousal from the scene.

In 1974 Katz, Blumler, and Gurevitch used the uses and gratifications theory to explain media psychology. Katz, Blumler, and Gurevitch discovered five components of the theory; (1) the media competes with sources of satisfaction, (2) goals of mass media can be discovered through data and research, (3) media lies within the audience, (4) an audience is conceived as active, and (5) judgment of mass media should not be expressed until the audience has time to process the media and its content on their own. Katz, Blumler, and Gurevitch found out that audience gratification from the media are rooted in three things, the content of the media, the exposure to it, and the social context that represents different media exposure. However, most of all it comes from the desire to kill time in a way that is worthwhile. They also discovered that different forms of media satisfy in different ways; it fulfills different needs. For example, certain forms of media are used as an escape, like movies at the cinema, but the news channel may be not.

David Giles has been publishing in the area of media psychology since 2000. He wrote a book about media psychology in 2003. His book Media Psychology gives an overview of media psychology as a field, its subcategories, theories, and developmental issues within media psychology. Giles started his career as a music journalist, before attending the University of Manchester to study psychology. He then continued his studies at University of Bristol, where he obtained his PhD. Since then, Giles has published numerous books, chapters, articles, and delivered presentations on psychology and the media, with a focus on the influence of celebrities and media figures. He has also worked as a professor of psychology at many universities in England, including universities of Bolton, Sheffield Hallam, Coventry and Lancaster. Since 2009 Giles has been working in the position of reader at the University of Winchester.

Bernard Luskin is a licensed psychotherapist, with degrees in business and a UCLA doctorate in education, psychology and technology. He is also the founder and CEO of Luskin International. Luskin has been the founding president and CEO of many colleges and universities, including: Orange Coast College, Jones International University, Touro University Worldwide, Moorpark College, and Oxnard College. He has also had success as a writer, publishing titles such as Introduction to Economics: A Performance-Based Learning Guide in 1977 and Casting the Net over Global Learning: New Developments in Workforce and Online Psychologies in 2022.

Pamela Rutledge is the Director of the Media Psychology Research Center in Newport Beach, California, and a faculty member in the Media Psychology Program at Fielding Graduate University. She is well known for the application of media psychology as to marketing and brand strategy, transmedia storytelling and audience engagement. According to Rutledge, while there is no specific consensus or career path for media psychology, there are many opportunities.

Media psychology and technology 
Media psychology involves all the research and applications which deal with all forms of media technologies. The media psychology comprises the prevailing customary and mass media, including radio, television, newsprint, magazines, music, film, and video. It comprises art with new emerging technologies and applications that include social media, mobile media, and interface design. media psychology enables us to create a better and new trajectory concerning how people think about, use, and design media technology in medial platforms. It helps provide tools that aid in identifying how technology has facilitated human goals. It also analyzes how the media becomes inadequate and the inadvertent outcomes of performance shifts, which determine better or worse applications.

The improvement has made media psychology of media studies; enhancement of communication in the people and sociology has enabled the various impact on different emergence of technology in different ways. The media psychology leads to the shift of the general focus from the center of inquiry in the given media-centric to the basic human-centric, leading to the enhancement of communication in the whole sector of media psychology. The use of marketing and public relations has made tremendous help in the whole media psychology analysis whereby customer research and media psychology have given different goals that do not go hand in hand with the other marketing and public relations sectors. The use of technology has enabled the improvement of global connection, limiting traditional activities, which led to the improved advancement of the media sector. The media advancement led to the more beneficial platform, which was possible to pass judgment, produce, and distribute analysis to the required platforms.

See also 
 Cyberpsychology
 Media effects
 Mediatization

References

External links
 Media Psychology Research Center
 Media Psychology: Division 46 of the American Psychological Association

Branches of psychology
Media studies